Union Peak is a heavily eroded shield volcano in the Cascade Range of central Oregon, located along the Cascade Crest less than  southwest of the rim of Crater Lake.  Ice age glaciers eroded away most of the flanks of the volcano, leaving numerous deep cirques surrounding a central glacial horn.  This is the same process that formed the summit horns of Three Fingered Jack, Mount Washington, Howlock Mountain, and Mount Thielsen from other shield volcanoes farther north in the Oregon Cascades.

Union Peak is located within Crater Lake National Park, and the summit was used as a post for fire lookouts from the 1930s to the 1950s.  A  trail leads to the summit from the Pacific Crest Trail off Oregon Route 62.

References 

 
 
 
 

Crater Lake National Park
Shield volcanoes of the United States
Subduction volcanoes
Cascade Volcanoes
Volcanoes of Oregon
Mountains of Oregon
Landmarks in Oregon
Cascade Range
Mountains of Klamath County, Oregon
Volcanoes of Klamath County, Oregon